The Annual Review of Resource Economics peer-reviewed academic journal that publishes an annual volume of review articles relevant to natural resource economics. It was established in 2009 and is published by the nonprofit organization Annual Reviews. The current co-editors are Gordon Rausser and David Zilberman.

History
The Annual Review of Resource Economics was first published in 2009 along with the Annual Review of Economics and the Annual Review of Financial Economics. The founding editor was Gordon Rausser. David Zilberman, initially an associate editor, is credited as co-editor with Rausser in issues from 2019 onwards. As of 2021, the journal is published both in print and electronically.

Scope and indexing
It defines its scope as covering significant developments in the field of natural resource economics, including facets such as agricultural economics, environmental economics, renewable resources, and non-renewable resources. As of 2022, Journal Citation Reports lists the journal's 2021 impact factor as 6.617, ranking it second of 21 journal titles in the category "Agricultural Economics and Policy (Science)", 20th of 127 in "Environmental Studies (Social Science)" and 27th of 379 in "Economics".  It is abstracted and indexed in Scopus, Science Citation Index Expanded, Social Sciences Citation Index, and EconLit, among others.

Editorial processes
The Annual Review of Resource Economics is helmed by the editor or the co-editors. The editor is assisted by the editorial committee, which includes associate editors, regular members, and occasionally guest editors. Guest members participate at the invitation of the editor, and serve terms of one year. All other members of the editorial committee are appointed by the Annual Reviews board of directors and serve five-year terms. The editorial committee determines which topics should be included in each volume and solicits reviews from qualified authors. Unsolicited manuscripts are not accepted. Peer review of accepted manuscripts is undertaken by the editorial committee.

Current editorial board
As of 2021, the editorial committee consists of the two co-editors and the following members:

 Thomas W. Hertel
 Matin Qaim
 Kathleen Segerson
 Richard J. Sexton
 Johan Swinnen
 Laura O. Taylor
 Anastasios Xepapadeas
 Jinhua Zhao

See also
 List of economics journals
 List of environmental economics journals

References

 

Economics journals
Resource Economics
Annual journals
English-language journals
Publications established in 2009